Cyphosticha acrolitha is a moth of the family Gracillariidae. It is known from Sri Lanka.

References

Gracillariinae
Moths of Sri Lanka
Moths described in 1908